"If You Go Away" is a song by American pop group New Kids on the Block (although the group was credited under the moniker of NKOTB on the jacket.)  Released as a stand-alone single on 1992, the only new song on the compilation H.I.T.S., it was later included on their 1994 album Face the Music. Written by John Bettis, Trey Lorenz and Walter Afanasieff, the latter of whom also served as the songs producer. Lead vocals are shared by Jordan Knight and Joey McIntyre, with a spoken word by Danny Wood. It was, at that point, the first song the group put out after having split with longtime manager and producer Maurice Starr.

Reception
The song returned the group to the US top twenty, peaking at number sixteen on the Billboard Hot 100 and number nine on the UK Singles Chart, and was a commercial rebound for the group after having seen its three previous songs all fail to reach the Billboard Hot 100. The group performed the song on The Arsenio Hall Show, while addressing an alleged lip-synching controversy. The single was the group's last hit until the release of the top 40 hit "Summertime" in 2008, and to date remains its final top twenty entry.

Personnel
 Jordan Knight, Joey McIntyre: lead vocals
 Danny Wood: spoken voice
 John Bettis, Trey Lorenz: songwriters
 Walter Afanasieff: songwriter, producer, arranger, keyboards, Mini Moog bass, drum programming, percussion, Synclavier acoustic guitar
 Dan Shea: additional synthesizer and MacIntosh programming
 Ren Klyce: Akai AX60 and Synclavier programming
 Michael Landau: guitar
 New Kids on the Block, Claytoven Richardson, Gary Cirimelli, Skyler Jett: background vocals

Track listings
UK Vinyl, 7" 
If You Go Away – 4:00
Call It What You Want [C&C Pump It Up 7" Mix] – 4:12

Maxi-CD 
If You Go Away – 4:00
Didn't I (Blow Your Mind) – 4:24
Please Don't Go Girl – 4:30
I'll Be Loving You (Forever) – 4:22

Charts

References

1991 singles
New Kids on the Block songs
Pop ballads

Songs with lyrics by John Bettis
Songs written by Walter Afanasieff
Columbia Records singles
Song recordings produced by Walter Afanasieff
Songs written by Trey Lorenz